PDS 110 is a young 11th magnitude star located approximately  away in the constellation Orion. In 2017, it was discovered that the star is orbited by an exoplanet or brown dwarf with a disk of dust around it.

Description
PDS 110 is a young star still approaching the main sequence. It has been classified as a T Tauri star, or as a pre-main sequence star. The emission lines indicative of a T Tauri classification are somewhat weaker than a typical T Tauri star, interpreted as a post-T Tauri stage.

Dust disk around secondary object 

Brightness measurements from SuperWASP and KELT showed two similar reductions in brightness in November 2008 and January 2011, both with a maximal luminosity reduction of 30% and a duration of 25 days. These events were interpreted as transits of a structure with a period of 808 ± 2 days, corresponding to an orbital distance of about 2 AU. The large reduction in brightness could have happened due to a planet or brown dwarf with a circum-secondary disk of dust with a radius of 0.3 AU around a central object with a mass between 1.8 and 70 times the mass of Jupiter. Another transit was predicted for September 2017, but nothing similar to the previous events was seen, ruling out a periodic event.

See also 
 Disrupted planet
 List of stars that have unusual dimming periods
 Ring system
V1400 Centauri

References

External links
Giant ringed planet likely cause of mysterious stellar eclipses

Planetary rings
Orion (constellation)
290380
J05233100-0104237
F-type subgiants
Pre-main-sequence stars
IRAS catalogue objects